Samrith Seiha (born 22 April 1990) is a former Cambodian footballer who last plays as a goalkeeper for the Cambodia national football team and the club team Nagaworld. Seiha made his debut in 2007 at the age of just 17.

References 

Living people
1990 births
Cambodian footballers
Cambodia international footballers
Association football goalkeepers
Angkor Tiger FC players
Phnom Penh Crown FC players
Nagaworld FC players